John Sloan Brown (born 30 August 1949) is a retired Brigadier General in the United States Army who was the Chief of Military History of the United States Army Center of Military History (CMH) from December 1998 to October 2005.

Born in West Germany to Texas-based parents and raised in South Carolina, Brown graduated from the United States Military Academy with a B.S. degree in 1971. He earned an M.A. degree in history from Indiana University in 1977 and then taught history at the U.S. Military Academy from 1981 to 1984 while completing his Ph.D. degree in history at Indiana University. His 1983 doctoral thesis was entitled Draftee Division: a study of the 88th Infantry Division, first all selective service division into combat in World War II. Brown earned a Master of Military Art and Science degree at the Army Command and General Staff College in 1985 with a thesis entitled Winning Teams: mobilization-related correlates of success in American World War II infantry divisions.

Brown commanded the 2nd Battalion, 66th Armor, in Iraq and Kuwait during the Gulf War and returned to Kuwait as commander of the 2nd Brigade, 1st Cavalry Division, in 1995. He served as Chief Historian and Commander of the United States Army Center of Military History from 1998 to 2005; however, he retired from active duty on 1 August 2004.

Publications

References

This article incorporates text in the public domain from the United States Army.
 

 

1949 births
Living people
Place of birth missing (living people)
United States Military Academy alumni
Military personnel from South Carolina
Indiana University alumni
United States Military Academy faculty
United States Army Command and General Staff College alumni
United States Army personnel of the Gulf War
United States Army generals
United States Army historians
American male non-fiction writers